The Temple Entry Proclamation was issued by Maharaja Chithira Thirunal Balarama Varma on November 12, 1936.

The proclamation was a milestone in the history of Travancore and Kerala. Today, Temple Entry Proclamation Day is considered to be a social reformation day by the Government of Kerala.

History 
Following the campaign to introduce social reform in Travancore inspired by the teachings of Narayana Guru and others, a deputation of six leaders appointed by the Harijan Sevak Sangh toured the princely state to obtain support from caste Hindus for so called untouchable people to be allowed to enter state-operated temples.

Vaikom Satyagraha
According to historian Romila Thapar, protests in 1924–25 against the prohibition of untouchables using a public road near a temple in Vaikom were a significant precursor to the temple entry movement. Known as the Vaikom Satyagraha, the protests sought equal rights of access in areas previously restricted to members of upper castes. The protests expanded to become a movement seeking rights of access to the interior of the temples themselves. These peaceful protests inspired the future 'it widely criticized that Temple Entry Declaration was done in order to prevent lower caste people converting in mass to Christianity. The then Travancore rulers feared that if Hindu majority is lost in the country, it will be difficult for them to manage.'satyagrahas of Mahatma Gandhi.

 Temple entry committee 

In 1932, the Maharajah, Chithira Thirunal appointed a committee to examine the question of temple entry. This opened the possibility of reversing the opposition to the practice that had been shown by his predecessors, Moolam Thirunal and Regent Maharani Sethu Lakshmi Bayi. Subsequent to a meeting with Gandhi, Bayi had released those who had been imprisoned by Moolam Thirunal for involvement with the Vaikom Satyagraha and had opened the north, south and west public roads that provided access to Vaikom Mahadeva Temple to all castes. She refused to open the eastern road to the temple because it was used by Brahmins. She avoided acting on Gandhi's advice by pointing out that she was a regent for her minor nephew, Chithira Thirunal and so had no power to do so.

Annoyed with this response Gandhi asked the 12-year-old prince, who immediately promised that it would happen during his reign. This incident was later quoted by K. R. Narayanan, the former President of India, in his speech referring to the progressive mind of Chithira Thirunal. 

The Regent's refusal to act on temple entry rights attracted criticism from people such as Mannathu Padmanabhan, who accused her of being under the influence of the Brahmins and said that her excuse that she had no power to decide was a lie.

 Royal proclamation and its aftermath 

Chithira Thirunal signed the Proclamation on the eve of his 24th birthday in 1936. C. P. Ramaswami Iyer said of the decision that: 

In an open letter addressed to the maharajah, Gandhi said: 

Historians believe that it was Aiyar's legal skill that overcame the practical difficulties posed by the orthodox Hindus before the proclamation. He foresaw the objections that could be raised against temple entry and dealt with them one by one. He was also able to ensure that the actual declaration was known beforehand to few people.

The Universities of Andhra and Annamalai conferred D.Litt. degrees on the Maharajah, and life-size statues of him were erected in Trivandrum and Madras.

Sociologists believe that the Proclamation struck at the root of caste discrimination in Travancore and that by serving to unite Hindus it prevented further conversions to other religions. The Proclamation was the first of its kind in a princely state as well as in British India. Even though there were agitations in various parts of India as well as rest of Kerala for temple entry, none managed to achieve their aim.

 Temple entry in Cochin And Malabar 
The Travancore Temple Entry Proclamation did not have a serious influence in Cochin or British Malabar as the Maharajah of Cochin and the Zamorin were staunch opponents of temple entry for dalits. The Cochin Maharajah went to the extent of declaring the whole people of Travancore as untouchables and forbade any Travancore citizen from entering temples under the control of the Cochin government. The Cochin ruler even forbade rituals like Arattu (holy bathing) and Para'' (holy procession) in Tripunithura and Chottanikkara temples. Eventually, a temple entry proclamation was issued in Cochin on December 22,1947 which came into force on April 14,1948. Even when universal temple entry was granted in 1947 the Cochin Maharajah made an exemption in the bill so as to keep his family temple, "Sree Poornathrayeesha", out of the purview of temple entry. The inhabitants of the Malabar region also finally received this right, as per the Madras Temple entry proclamation issued on June 12,1947. 

The Zamorin of Malabar had no wish to change the existing customs and usages in temples; on hearing the news of the Travancore Temple Entry proclamation he said that the Travancore Maharajah did not have the authority to do so as he was only a trustee of the temples which were under the supervision of Hindu Religions Endowment Board. He also sent a memorandum to the authorities claiming no one had the authority to take decisions regarding temple entry as they were private properties. Universal temple entry was only granted in Malabar region in 1947 after India's independence.

See also
Kandoth assault

References

External links 
 www.india.gov.in/knowindia/state_uts.php?id=64
 www.kerala.cc/keralahistory
 www.kerala.gov.in/knowkerala/
 www.hindubooks.org/temples/kerala
 niyamasabha.org/codes

Indian caste legislation
Hindu law
Hindu temples
Kingdom of Travancore
History of Kerala
20th-century Hinduism
1936 in India
1936 in law
1936 documents
Social history of Kerala
Ezhava
Proclamations
Hindu temples in Kerala
Vaikom